Beverly Hills (born 23 March 1966) is a British actress and television presenter. She is known for her many roles in BBC dramas and in children's TV.

Career

Drama 
From October 1987 to July 1991, Hills played Julia Brennan in BBC Radio 4's drama series Citizens.

Hills has played many roles across the BBC since the early 90s. She has played Kate Warren in Backup, Tina in Knights & Emeralds, Elaine Davies-Johnson in Brookside, Liz Walton in Accused, Monika Gaye in Peak Practice, Shirley Slipman in  The Bill, Viv Kelly in Dalziel and Pascoe and she has also appeared in Casualty, Holby City, Silent Witness, New Tricks and Waking the Dead.

Children's TV 
Hills has spent a lot of time in children's television, with a career of presenting and writing for Children's BBC. She started out on the long running series Magic Grandad, a BBC schools programme for under-6s, on BBC2. In 1995, she began presenting the long running BBC Schools series Storytime. She presented the last four 4 series between 1995 and 1997. In 2002, Hills become one of the main presenters on the hit Cbeebies pre-school series Tikkabilla for which she also wrote for. From 2007 to 2010, she regularly appeared in the CBBC sitcom Bear Behaving Badly as the role of 'Postie'. Hills also wrote episodes for the CBeebies pre-school series The Story Makers.

Filmography

References

External links

1966 births
Living people
British actresses
British television actresses